The athletics competition at the 2003 European Youth Summer Olympic Festival was held from 28 to 31 July. The events took place at the Charléty Stadium in Paris, France. Boys and girls born 1986 or 1987 or later participated 31 track and field events, with similar programmes for the sexes with the exception of no steeplechase event for girls.

Medal summary

Men

Women

References

Results
2003 European Youth Olympics. World Junior Athletics History. Retrieved on 2014-11-24.
European Youth Olympics. GBR Athletics. Retrieved on 2014-11-24.

2003 European Youth Summer Olympic Festival
European Youth Summer Olympic Festival
2003
2003 European Youth Summer Olympic Festival
2003 European Youth Summer Olympics Festival